Gethuk is an Indonesian-Javanese dish made from cassava. The cassava is peeled, boiled and mashed. Then it is mixed with grated coconut, sugar and small amounts of salt. Sugar can also be replaced with palm sugar to give it brownish color and more distinctive taste.

Other method to make gethuk is by grinding it with meat grinder and cut it into cubes. This kind of getuk also known as getuk lindri. While grinding butter, sugar, salt, and sometimes also milk powder, vanilla, and food coloring is added. Usually sold by seller that goes around the neighborhood in East Java.

See also

 Kue lapis
 Javanese cuisine

Javanese cuisine
Vegetarian dishes of Indonesia
Kue
Street food in Indonesia